Kinoarashi Kazutoshi (born 9 July 1961 as Kazutoshi Ishiyama) is a former sumo wrestler from Yūbari, Hokkaidō, Japan. He joined professional sumo in 1977 and reached the top makuuchi division in 1982. His highest rank was maegashira 2. He fell to the sandanme division through injury before staging a successful comeback to the top division in 1987. He retired in 1991.

Career
His father was a coal miner. He played baseball and table tennis at junior high school. He joined Oshiogawa stable, recruited by the former Daikirin. He made his professional debut in March 1977, alongside another future top division wrestler from the same stable, Enazakura. He reached the top division in March 1982. He was touted as a possible candidate for ozeki and was named "Rookie of the Year" by the Tokyo Chunichi Sports newspaper after earning a kinboshi for defeating yokozuna Kitanoumi in September 1982. However he suffered a serious injury to his left knee whilst training with Hōō at Nishonoseki stable in 1983 which led to him missing several tournaments and falling to the fourth sandanme division. He slowly rose again in the ranks and won the juryo division yusho or tournament championship in September 1986.

In March 1987 he was promoted back to the top division. At the time he held the record for lowest rank fallen before a successful return to makuuchi at Sandanme #25 (this record stood for 28 years before being surpassed by Tosayutaka in 2015). However, due to the severity of his injury he was unable to fulfill his early promise. He did not manage to earn another kinboshi or win a special prize and never managed to reach the sanyaku ranks, his highest rank of maegashira 2 being achieved back in November 1982. He left the sumo world upon retirement in September 1991, and opened a chanko restaurant in Koto, Tokyo.

Fighting style
Kinoarashi favoured yotsu-sumo, or grappling techniques, and used a left hand outside, right hand inside (migi-yotsu) grip on his opponent's mawashi. His favourite kimarite or techniques were yori-kiri (force out), yori-taoshi (force out and down) uwate nage (overarm throw), and sukui nage (scoop throw).

Career record

See also
Glossary of sumo terms
List of past sumo wrestlers
List of sumo tournament second division champions

References

1961 births
Living people
Japanese sumo wrestlers
Sumo people from Hokkaido